Tropidosuchus is an extinct genus of carnivorous archosauriforms from the Middle Triassic period (Anisian to Ladinian stage). It is a proterochampsid which lived in what is now Argentina. It is known from the holotype PVL 4601, which consists of partial skeleton. It was found in the Chañares Formation and its type locality is the Chañares River. It was first named by A. B. Arcucci in 1990 and the type species is Tropidosuchus romeri.

References 

Proterochampsians
Ladinian genera
Middle Triassic reptiles of South America
Triassic Argentina
Fossils of Argentina
Chañares Formation
Fossil taxa described in 1990
Prehistoric reptile genera